.xnk is a file extension used by Microsoft Outlook for shortcuts to Outlook entities (e.g., a folder in Public Folders).  In Outlook 2003, a user can double-click such a file to open it.  With Office 2007, the extension is no longer recognized by default, due to alleged security concerns.  Microsoft has posted instructions on re-enabling this extension.

Microsoft Office
Computer file formats